The Galaxy Y Plus GT-S5303 is a mobile phone from Samsung.  It was announced in March 2013 and was released in May 2013. It holds 2 SIM cards.

See also
 Galaxy Nexus
 List of Android devices
 Samsung Galaxy Y
 Samsung Galaxy Young

References

External links 

Mobile phones introduced in 2013
Samsung mobile phones
Samsung Galaxy
Samsung smartphones
Android (operating system) devices